Friday Filmworks is an Indian motion picture production company founded by Neeraj Pandey and Shital Bhatia in 2008.

History
Set up in 2008, Friday Filmworks has produced trend-setting films that are original in content and entertaining to the audience. A Wednesday was the first movie under the banner which won many awards in different categories. The other films under the Friday Filmworks include Special 26, Baby, Total Siyapaa, Saat Uchakkey, M.S. Dhoni: The Untold Story, Naam Shabana.

Friday Filmworks released a satirical comedy Toilet: Ek Prem Katha on 11 August 2017 and Aiyaary in 2018.

Friday Filmworks also produced a Marathi film Taryanche Bait in 2011 and a Bengali film The Royal Bengal Tiger in 2014.

Neeraj Pandey's powerful short film 'Ouch' was shown for the first time ever at the Mumbai Film Festival, well known for showcasing the best of films in front of a demanding audience.

In 2016, Friday Filmworks and Reliance Entertainment came together to form a new venture named Plan C Studios to produce films. The movie Rustom which was released in 2016 was the first film under this venture. Toilet: Ek Prem Katha and Naam Shabana are planned to be released worldwide in 2017 under Plan C Studios.

Friday Storytellers 

 Friday Storytellers is the Digital Content Production arm of Friday Filmworks which was founded in 2019 for the production of Special OPS for Hotstar.

Filmography

Bootroom Sports 
Founded by Sudip Tewari, an ex-banker along with Neeraj Pandey & Shital Bhatia, Bootroom Sports was created as a sports media company. Through content, platform, and experience, the company aims to showcase sports' extraordinary humans and its economic potential in India.

References

External links 

Film production companies based in Mumbai
2008 establishments in Maharashtra
Mass media companies established in 2008